Buycott.com is an Internet-based platform and smart-phone application that reads the Universal Product Codes (UPC) barcode on a product, and suggests whether a consumer should buy or avoid that product based on how well it aligns with the consumer's values and principles. The consumer joins to various Buycott campaigns to indicate their support or their opposition to various issues and topics. The app advises them about purchasing from corporate entities - and their affiliates - that endorse policies which conflict with those campaigns. The consumer can thus "vote with their wallet", and opt to purchase a competing product, or forgo the purchase altogether.

As of March 2023, the latest update to app has been on the 21st of October 2016. The latest social media posts on Facebook, Instagram, and Twitter have all also been before the end of 2016. The latest update to the Terms and Conditions page was on December 2015

Buycott.com was launched to encourage Corporate Social Responsibility, prior to the point of purchase, and raise awareness that consumer purchases have real-world consequences. The app has a rich database behind the web interface. Buycott claims to have a database of over 150 million product UPC tags as unique product identifiers. The database contains all sorts of consumer products from foods to cosmetics to services such as restaurant chains and hotels. Buycott.com also queries consumer activists for scanned product information when the database is missing product descriptions or other information, each campaign's database relevancy and success is dependent upon the membership's participation.

References

External links 
 

2013 software
Consumer boycotts
Activism
Consumer organizations in the United States
Community organizing
Protest tactics